This list of the oldest banks includes financial institutions in continuous operation, operating with the same legal identity without interruption since their establishment until the present time.

Depending on the definition, the world's oldest bank is either Banca Monte dei Paschi di Siena or Berenberg Bank. Banca Monte dei Paschi di Siena was founded in its present form in 1624, but traces its history to a mount of piety founded in 1472. The Berenberg company was founded in 1590 and has operated continuously ever since with the same family as owners or major co-owners. Banca Monte dei Paschi di Siena is today a large Italian retail bank, while Berenberg Bank is primarily involved in investment banking and private banking for wealthy customers; in any event Berenberg Bank is the world's oldest merchant bank or investment bank. The world's oldest central bank is the Sveriges Riksbank, which was founded in 1668.



Banks established before 1600

Banks established in the 17th century

Banks established in the 18th century

Banks established in the 19th century

See also
 History of banking
 List of oldest companies

References

Literature
 Manfred Pohl, Sabine Freitag, Handbook on the History of European Banks, European Association for Banking History, 1994

Economy-related lists of superlatives
Lists of banks
History of banking
Banks
Lists of companies
Lists of longest-duration things